Naturally 7 is an American music group with a distinct a cappella style they call "vocal play," which, according to group leader Roger Thomas, is "the art of becoming an instrument using the human voice to create the sound." They simulate the sounds of an instrumental band using only their voices, mouths and distortion effects. The group was formed in 1999 in New York City. It currently consists of the Thomas brothers Roger (musical director, arranger, first baritone, rapping) and Warren (drums, third tenor), Rod Eldridge (first tenor, scratching, guitar, trumpet), Ricky Cort (first tenor, guitar), Dwight Stewart (second baritone, vocals, trombone), Sean Simmonds (second tenor, harmonica), and N'Namdi Bryant (bass guitar, trumpet).

History

Early Years 
Naturally 7 was founded in 1999 by brothers Roger and Warren Thomas, from Rosedale, Queens. The brothers recruited five other singers they had come to know over the years of singing around the city. Roger Thomas developed his singing quality after being in and out of several traditional male groups over the years. When the group was invited to sing at a major a cappella competition in New York City, they won and moved onto the nationals before they took two more wins in the competition. Riding their new-found success and still having made no decision whether to have Naturally 7 as an a cappella group or a traditional band, Roger had the novel idea that the group would become both.

Ready II Fly 
Naturally 7 has released a number of albums over the years since the formation at New York City in 1999, including their debut studio album entitled Non-Fiction released in 2000, What Is It released in 2003, Christmas... It's a Love Story released in 2004, and Ready II Fly in 2006, released through Virginia Records. The group gained success by the partial cover of Phil Collins's "In the Air Tonight", titled as "Feel It (In the Air Tonight)", which contains additional lyrics from the group. The performance of the song at a subway has received over four and a half million hits on YouTube alone, and a number of people discovering the group, which adds to a figure daily. The single itself has turned into a Top 3-chart- success in countries outside North America, such as France, Belgium and South Africa, and also made the single charts in other European countries.

Wall of Sound 
In January 2009, the group released Wall of Sound as an exclusive special album in the United Kingdom and Ireland to commemorate their participation at the Royal Variety Performance. It contains known material from their previous albums, as well as five brand new tracks, which entered the British Album-Charts in the first week after release at #29. The group appeared on The Late Late Show with Craig Ferguson, performing "Stardust" with Michael Bublé. In November 2009, the group travelled to Bermuda, as they took part in Quincy Jones's 2009 Bermuda Music Festival performing before an enthusiastic crowd.

Vocal Play 
The CD/DVD version of Vocal Play, which was released in 2010, contains original self-made tracks, such as "SOS (Anybody Out There)", the power ballad of "Love Me", the Motown-influenced “Ready or Not”, the Latin 768 and a duet with Michael Bublé on the Dinah Washington classic, “Relax Max”. The DVD includes HD live material from their performance at Madison Square Garden, extensive interviews with each group member, as well as their video clips. In fall 2010, the group, along with American rapper Ludacris, were featured on a track that appeared in Quincy Jones's album, Soul Bossa Nostra, which led them to a performance at The View in November, before continuing on touring with Bublé. Naturally 7 contributed a few songs for the soundtrack of the 2010 German/English dub film Animals United, including "King of the Road", "Splish Splash", "Hokey Pokey", and "Move On Up".

Members

Current

Former

Timeline

Discography

Studio albums

Singles

Featured songs
Xavier Naidoo: "Wild vor Wut" (featuring Naturally 7)
Quincy Jones: "Soul Bossa Nostra" (featuring Ludacris, Naturally 7, & Rudy Currence) album Q: Soul Bossa Nostra
 Xavier Naidoo: "A New Horizon" (featuring Naturally 7) from the German/English dub film Animals United (2010). A "Vocal Play" version is included on the soundtrack, which was released on December 7, 2010 through Königskinder Music, and is also available on iTunes.

Other songs 
The following songs are included on the soundtrack for the 2010 German/English dub film, Animals United:
 "King of the Road"
 "Splish Splash"
 "Move On Up"
 "Hokey Pokey"

MLK Day performance
In January 2016, in honor of Martin Luther King Jr. Day, the group performed with The Maccabeats, a Jewish a cappella group from Yeshiva University, in a cover of James Taylor's "Shed a Little Light." The music video was filmed in front of the Lincoln Memorial in Washington, D.C., where King delivered his "I Have a Dream" speech. Taylor called the performance "one of the best covers of 'Shed a Little Light' I've ever heard."

References

External links
 
 Video of "Feel It (In the Air Tonight)" performance on the Paris Metro
 Interview by Michael 'The Dood' Edwards 'UK Vibe' June 2009
 A profound feature with interviews in May 2015 at Soul Express

Professional a cappella groups
Musical groups from New York City